Neil Henry Pitt (31 December 1929 – 3 May 1996) was an Australian politician. Born in Launceston, he was elected to the Tasmanian House of Assembly as a Liberal member for Bass in 1972, holding his seat until his defeat in 1976.

References

1929 births
1996 deaths
Liberal Party of Australia members of the Parliament of Tasmania
Members of the Tasmanian House of Assembly
Politicians from Launceston, Tasmania
20th-century Australian politicians